This is a list of members of the Tasmanian Legislative Council between 1945 and 1951. Terms of the Legislative Council did not coincide with Legislative Assembly elections, and members served six year terms, with a number of members facing election each year.

A major redistribution in 1946 resulted in the multi-member divisions of Hobart and Launceston being split up—the old divisions remained as single-member divisions, whilst Hobart spawned Newdegate and Queenborough, and Launceston spawned Cornwall. A new division of West Devon was created from rural areas of Mersey, whilst Cambridge combined with parts of Macquarie to form the new Monmouth.

Elections

Members

Notes
  On 20 December 1945, Charles Eady, the member for Hobart, died. The seat was not filled as the term was due to be filled at the 1946 elections.
  On 2 January 1946, Joe Darling, the member for Cambridge, died. Geoffrey Green won the resulting by-election on 23 February 1946.
  On 17 October 1947, James McDonald, the Labor member for Gordon, died. Labor candidate Thomas d'Alton won the resulting by-election on 22 November 1947.
  On 5 March 1948, William Strutt, the member for Queenborough, died. Henry Baker won the resulting by-election on 8 May 1948.
  On 2 August 1948, Bill Wedd, the member for Buckingham, resigned to contest one of the Denison seats in the August 1948 House of Assembly election. Labor candidate James Bell Connolly won the resulting by-election. This was the first occasion on which a Labor candidate had won a non-Labor-held seat at a Legislative Council by-election.
  On 2 September 1948, Margaret McIntyre, the member for Cornwall and the first woman elected to the Legislative Council, died four months into her term. Ernest Record won the resulting by-election on 16 October 1948.
  In April 1950, Richard Green, the member for Launceston, resigned to become a judge of the Supreme Court of Tasmania. Labor candidate Arthur Grounds won the resulting by-election on 13 May 1950.

Sources
 
 Parliament of Tasmania (2006). The Parliament of Tasmania from 1856

Members of Tasmanian parliaments by term
20th-century Australian politicians